Fasken, formerly Fasken Martineau DuMoulin, is an international business law firm with approximately 700 lawyers and offices in Vancouver, Surrey, Calgary, Toronto, Ottawa, Montréal, Québec City, Beijing, London and Johannesburg. On 29 November 2017, the firm announced that it is changing its name to Fasken. The firm was founded in 1863.

History 
Fasken began as a merger of three predecessor firms: Fasken Campbell Godfrey; Martineau Walker; and Russell & DuMoulin. (Fasken Campbell Godfrey in Toronto formed from the 1989 merger of two long standing Toronto firms — Fasken & Calvin, which began as Beatty and Chadwick, founded in 1863 by William Henry Beatty and Edward Marion Chadwick; Campbell Godfrey & Lewtas, which began as Howland & Arnoldi, in the 1880s; Martineau Walker in Montreal, which dates from 1907; and Russell & DuMoulin in Vancouver, dating from 1882.)

In late 1999, Toronto-based Fasken Campbell Godfrey and Quebec-based Martineau Walker (Montreal and Quebec City) joined, forming Fasken Martineau. In February 2000, Vancouver-based Russell & DuMoulin joined to create Fasken Martineau DuMoulin LLP.

Notable members and alumni 
 Joel Lightbound, Canadian member of Parliament
 Mark Andrews, University boat race winner
 Jeff Dennis, Toronto entrepreneur
 Guy Giorno, former political operative
 Claude R. Thomson

References

Law firms of Canada
Law firms established in 2000
2000 establishments in Canada